Theater in Cronenberg is a theatre in Wuppertal, North Rhine-Westphalia, Germany.

Theatres in Wuppertal